Tymfristos is a village and a former community in Phthiotis, Greece. Since the 2011 local government reform it is part of the municipality Makrakomi, of which it is a municipal unit. The municipal unit has an area of 28.681 km2. Population 434 (2011).

External links
 Community of Tymfristos

References

Populated places in Phthiotis